Chi Ophiuchi, Latinized from χ Ophiuchi, is a variable star in the equatorial constellation of Ophiuchus. It has a blue-white hue and is faintly visible to the naked eye with an apparent visual magnitude that fluctuates around 4.22. The distance to this object, as determined from parallax measurements, is approximately 500 light years, but it is moving closer to the Sun with a radial velocity of −19 km/s. This star is a proper motion member of the Upper Scorpius sub-group in the Scorpius–Centaurus OB association; the nearest such co-moving association of massive stars to the Sun.

This is a massive Be star with a stellar classification of B2Vne, where the 'n' indicates "nebulous" lines due to rapid rotation. It is spinning with a projected rotational velocity of 144 km/s. As the critical velocity for the star is 477 km/s, the inclination angle of its poles must be small; estimated as ~20°. It is a Gamma Cassiopeiae variable with an amplitude of 0.15 magnitude. The brightness has been measured varying from magnitude 4.18 down to 5.0.

Chi Ophiuchi is 22.5 million years old with 10.1 times the mass of the Sun. It has four times the Sun's radius and is radiating 56,000 times the luminosity of the Sun from its photosphere at an effective temperature of about 30,000 K. A weak magnetic field has been detected in the chromosphere of this star.

Abt and Levy (1978) cataloged Chi Ophiuchi as a single-lined spectroscopic binary with a period of 138.8 days and an eccentricity of 0.44, although the orbital elements are considered marginal. Eggleton and Tokovinin (2008) list it as a single star.

References

Be stars
Lambda Eridani variables
Gamma Cassiopeiae variable stars
Upper Scorpius

Ophiuchus (constellation)
Ophiuchi, Chi
BD-18 4282
Ophiuchi, 07
148184
080569
6118